Aleksandr Krotov may refer to:

 Aleksandr Krotov (footballer, born 1895), Russian football player
 Alyaksandr Krotaw (born 1995), Belarusian football player